Breakout is an album by jazz organist Johnny Hammond recorded for the Kudu label in 1971. The album was the first release on Creed Taylor's Kudu label, a subsidiary of CTI Records. Hammond had previously recorded as Johnny "Hammond" Smith; this was the first album for which he dropped his surname.

Reception

The Allmusic site awarded the album 4 stars calling it "a blessed-out basket of blues and groove that covers some of the hot tunes of the day and some organ classics with enough soul power to melt the ice around the heart of even the staunchest jazz purist" and stating "This is a smoking album that runs the gamut of soul-jazz to hard funk and R&B seamlessly, but sweatily".

Track listing
All compositions by Johnny "Hammond" Smith except where noted
 "It's Too Late" (Carole King, Toni Stern) - 10:50  
 "Workin' On a Groovy Thing" (Roger Atkins, Neil Sedaka) - 6:35  
 "Never Can Say Goodbye" (Clifton Davis) - 5:35  
 "Blues Selah" (Leo Johnson) - 6:40  
 "Breakout" - 4:45

Personnel
Johnny Hammond - organ, arranger
Danny Moore - trumpet
Grover Washington, Jr. - tenor saxophone, arranger
Hank Crawford - alto saxophone
Eric Gale - guitar
Johnny Williams  - electric bass
Billy Cobham - drums
Airto Moreira - percussion
Leo Johnson - arranger (track 4)

Production
 Creed Taylor - producer
 Rudy Van Gelder - engineer

References

Johnny "Hammond" Smith albums
1971 albums
Kudu Records albums
Albums produced by Creed Taylor
Albums recorded at Van Gelder Studio